Netball is one of the sports played at the 2019 Pacific Games which was held at Apia in Samoa. This is the twelfth time that netball has been in the games since its inclusion in 1963. The competition took place between 15 July to 20 July 2019. Eight nations were competing in the competition with the defending champions Fiji being absent due to competing at the 2019 Netball World Cup.

Preliminary round

Group A

Group B

Consolation Stage

Semi-finals

7th place match

5th place match

Knockout stage

Semi-finals

Third place match

Final

Final standings

See also
Netball at the Pacific Games

References

2019 Pacific Games
Pacific Games
Netball at the Pacific Games
Pacific